Sibon is a genus of snakes found in northern South America, Central America and Mexico.

Species
There are 21 Sibon species:

Nota bene: A binomial authority in parentheses indicates that the species was originally described in a genus other than Sibon.

References

Further reading
Fitzinger LI (1826). Neue Classification der Reptilien nach ihren natürlichen Verwandtschaften. Nebst einer Verwandtschafts-tafel und einem Verzeichnisse der Reptilien-Sammlung des K. K. zoologischen Museum's zu Wien. Vienna: J.G. Heubner. five unnumbered + 67 pp. + one plate. (Sibon, new genus, pp. 29, 31). (in German and Latin).
Freiberg M (1982). Snakes of South America. Hong Kong: T.F.H. Publications. 189 pp. . (Genus Sibon, pp. 68, 70, 109).

Colubrids
Reptiles of South America
Reptiles of Central America
Reptiles of North America
Snake genera
Taxa named by Leopold Fitzinger